Langham is a town in Saskatchewan, Canada. It is located on Highway 16, 35 kilometres northwest of the city of Saskatoon.  The 2011 census reported a population of 1,290, with 489 homes in the community.

Originally, the area was primarily settled by Mennonites. Langham was named after E. Langham, a purchasing agent for the Canadian National Railway. Langham was founded in 1904 with the building of a rail line between Saskatoon and Edmonton, Alberta.  Langham was declared a village in 1906, and became a town in 1907.

Schools
There are two public schools to service the children of Langham and area.  Approximately 150 Grades K to 5 students attend Langham Elementary School, while approximately 210 Grades 6 to 12 students attend Walter W Brown High School.  Both schools are part of Prairie Spirit School Division, which includes communities that surround the city of Saskatoon.  As well, 3 and 4 year olds can access a preK program at Li'l Vikings Preschool. And at the Elementary there is a before and after school program for any grade preK - 5.

Economy
The town's economy is based on commuters to the nearby city, and on agriculture.  There are a number of local businesses, which include a general car maintenance and repair shop, insurance services, an autobody repair shop, a financial institution, a restaurant, daycares, gas bar, income tax services.

Entertainment and attractions

Langham is home to a branch of the Wheatland Regional Library, which is open throughout the year, offering story time programs for young children.

Each fall, the Langham Theatrical Company host and perform a dinner theatre for the first two weeks in November.  
The Langham & District Heritage Village & Museum is open from May long weekend to September 30.  The museum's purpose is to showcase and preserve the artifacts that show the history and development of Langham and District.
River Valley RV Park has 31 fully serviced campsites and is located on the edge of the Town of Langham.
The River Hills Golf Course is a 9-hole course situated on the Saskatchewan River approximately 5 km north of Langham. In the winter, groomed ski trails allow this facility to be used year-round.

Activities
Langham is an In Motion community.  This includes an In Motion Walk and Talk, as well as a Low Impact Fitness & Strength Training program.  The Summer Activities Program occurs around town from early July until late August.  Sporting, crafting, and social events happen throughout the summer.  Community sport activities include hockey, curling, and figure skating in the winter, and soccer, softball, and slowpitch in the spring and summer.

Churches
Langham offers one of the highest numbers of churches per capita in Canada. Churches in Langham include the St. Mark Catholic Church, Knox United Church, Langham Mennonite Fellowship (formerly Zoar Mennonite Church), Langham Evangelical Bible Church, First Sask. Lutheran Church, and the Emmanuel Church.

Demographics 

Geography
Rural Saskatchewan is known for the support that communities give each other in the form of attending community activities, sharing sport teams, and building friendships among children and adults from neighboring towns and cities.  Communities that surround Langham include Dalmeny, Borden, Martensville, Warman, and of course, Saskatoon.  Also, Sarilia Country Estates is a new development that has been created along the Saskatchewan River approximately 6 miles north of Langham.

See also
Rural Municipality of Corman Park No. 344

References

External links

Towns in Saskatchewan
Division No. 11, Saskatchewan